The Kandi K10 is a city car produced by the Chinese manufacturer Kandi Technologies between 2015 and 2017.

History 
The K10 appeared in the offer of the Chinese company Kandi in 2015, implementing the concept of a small, city electric vehicle built with the domestic market in mind. The K10 took the form of a 3-door hatchback, gaining a two-tone painting of the body made of plastic.

In November 2015, Kandi established cooperation with the Chinese startup Pang Da, delivering 1000 K10 units for the needs of city carsharing.

Sale
After 2 years of production and sale of the K10 on the Chinese domestic market, the car was withdrawn from the market in 2017 in favor of newer designs and following the decision of the Chinese authorities to temporarily suspend Kandi Technologies due to allegations of unstable financial situation.

Technical data
The electrical system of the K10 consists of a 20 kWh battery which provides 47 hp and a maximum range of 150 kilometers. Charging the battery to 100% takes about 10 hours.

References 

2010s cars
Cars introduced in 2015
Electric city cars
Front-wheel-drive vehicles
K10